Efailnewydd is a village on the  Llŷn Peninsula (Welsh: Penrhyn Llŷn) in the Welsh county of Gwynedd.  It lies 1.2 miles (2 km) north west of the market town of Pwllheli. The village forms part of the community of Llannor along with the villages of Y Ffor, Abererch and Rhos-fawr.
The wards population was 1,275. and includes the community of Buan.

Pwllheli Rugby Club's playing field and clubhouse are located in the village. There is also a small shop located at the centre of the village.

References

External links 

www.geograph.co.uk : photos of Efailnewydd and surrounding area

Villages in Gwynedd
Llannor